Yeshey Penjor is a Bhutanese politician who has been Minister for Agriculture and Forests since November 2018. He has been a member of the National Assembly of Bhutan, since October 2018.

Early life and education

He graduated from the Asian Institute of Technology (AIT), Thailand and received a degree of Master of Science in Environment and Management.

Professional career
Before joining politics, he has served as the Project Director of Green Public Procurement Project and has served as Climate Change Policy Advisor with the United Nations Development Programme (UNDP) of Bhutan and the National Environment Commission.

Political career
Penjor is a member Druk Nyamrup Tshogpa (DNT). He was elected to the National Assembly of Bhutan in the 2018 elections for the Nubi-Tangsibji constituency. On 3 November, Lotay Tshering formally announced his cabinet structure and Penjor was named as Minister for Agriculture and Forests. On 7 November 2018, he was sworn in as Minister for Agriculture and Forests in the cabinet of Prime Minister Lotay Tshering.

References 

Living people
Bhutanese politicians
1964 births
Bhutanese MNAs 2018–2023
Asian Institute of Technology alumni
Lotay Tshering ministry
Druk Nyamrup Tshogpa politicians
Druk Nyamrup Tshogpa MNAs